Marcel van de Veen (born 3 October 1961) is a Dutch sailor who has competed two Paralympics games winning silver in 2004 and gold in 2012 in the three person keelboat the sonar.

References

External links

1961 births
Dutch disabled sportspeople
Dutch male sailors (sport)
Living people
World champions in sailing for the Netherlands
Sonar class world champions
Disabled sailing world champions
Paralympic sailors of the Netherlands
Sailors at the 2004 Summer Paralympics
Sailors at the 2012 Summer Paralympics
Paralympic medalists in sailing
Paralympic gold medalists for the Netherlands